In the 2009–10 season, MC Alger competed in the National 1 for the 39th season, as well as the Algerian Cup. It was their 7th consecutive season in the top flight of Algerian football.

Squad list
Players and squad numbers last updated on 18 November 2009.Note: Flags indicate national team as has been defined under FIFA eligibility rules. Players may hold more than one non-FIFA nationality.

Pre-season

Competitions

Overview

{| class="wikitable" style="text-align: center"
|-
!rowspan=2|Competition
!colspan=8|Record
!rowspan=2|Started round
!rowspan=2|Final position / round
!rowspan=2|First match	
!rowspan=2|Last match
|-
!
!
!
!
!
!
!
!
|-
| National 1

|  
| style="background:gold;"|Winners
| 6 August 2009
| 31 May 2010
|-
| Algerian Cup

| Round of 64 
| Quarter-final
| 25 December 2009
| 9 April 2010
|-
! Total

National 1

League table

Results summary

Results by round

Matches

Algerian Cup

Squad information

Playing statistics

|-

|-
! colspan=10 style=background:#dcdcdc; text-align:center| Players transferred out during the season

Goalscorers
Includes all competitive matches. The list is sorted alphabetically by surname when total goals are equal.

Transfers

In

Out

References

MC Alger seasons
MC Alger